Liubava Dmitrievna Zavidich  (?-1169), was a Grand Princess of the Kiev by marriage to Mstislav I of Kiev, Grand Prince of Kiev (r. 1125–1132).  She is mainly known for her political activities in favor of her son during her widowhood. 

She was the daughter of Dmitry Saviditsch, a nobleman of Novgorod. 

She married Mstislav I of Kiev after the death of his first spouse in 1122. 
Their children were:
 Vladimir III Mstislavich (1132–1171)
 Euphrosyne of Kiev, (c. 1130 – c. 1193) married King Géza II of Hungary in 1146.

References

Year of birth unknown
Date of death unknown
Kievan Rus' princesses
12th-century Rus' women